A court shoe (British English), or pump (American English), is a shoe with a low-cut front, or vamp, with either a shoe buckle or a black bow as ostensible fastening. Deriving from the 17th and 18th century dress shoes with shoe buckles, the vamped pump shape emerged in the late 18th century. By the turn of the 19th century, shoe buckles were increasingly replaced by black bows, which has remained the contemporary style for men's formal wear, leather or patent leather evening pumps ever since. This latter style is sometimes also called an opera pump or opera slipper.

The construction of pumps is simple, using a whole-cut leather top with a low vamp, lined with either quilted silk or plain leather, trimmed with braid at the opening. The full leather sole is either glued onto the bottom, common on cheaper styles, or sewn, as on more costly bespoke styles still made traditionally, using a shallow slit to lift a flap of leather around the edge to recess and hide the stitching. The sole is, as on ordinary shoes, several layers of leather put together. The bow is made of grosgrain silk or rayon, in a pinched or flat form.

For women, pumps with a strap across the instep are called Mary Janes. Pumps may have an ankle strap.

Menswear

In the Regency period, during the day upper-class gentlemen in western Europe wore dress boots, and boots or pumps by night, which accompanied silk knee-high stockings and breeches. The shoes originally had silver cut-steel buckles, but these were removed by the influence of Brummell, and a square grosgrain bow was added. By Victorian times, evening footwear was pumps when there would be dancing or music (hence the name opera shoe or opera slipper), and patent leather dress boots otherwise. Pumps remained as standard with evening full dress until the 1930s. At that time, the dress boot was also going out of fashion, as laced shoes began to be worn at all times.

Even though it now survives in much the same form as it was at the start of the 19th century (though it is occasionally now worn with plain, not patent or calf) pumps have been largely displaced by Oxfords, perhaps because of an effeminate image and the declining use of white tie. It remains acceptable (though rare) with black tie, and, since formal boots are now hardly ever worn, pumps are standard with white tie, their only remaining common use. They are still preferred with formalwear by many leaders of style. The original versions worn with cut-steel buckles are still worn as part of British court uniform and dress.

Womenswear

Pumps for women are usually heeled. The shape has varied through time. In the UK, a closed toe and wide (non-stiletto) heel have been worn by the very fashion-conscious, but most still wore stilettos of mainly 'kitten' height to medium height.

In the UK, outside the fashion trade, the term "pumps" would normally imply flat or low-heel dancing or ballerina pumps, or even rubber-soled canvas plimsolls. In the U.S., "pumps" exclusively refers to women's shoes with a kitten or higher heel.

Pumps can be made from any material, but traditional patent leather is popular. Pumps are mostly worn with a suit or a uniform, but are also worn with formal and informal dresses, skirts, trousers, and jeans. 

Pumps are also part of the costume of a ballroom dancer. They are made of satin, usually tan, though other colors are made as well, and worn on both the competition and practice floors.

Recent studies highlight the relationship between foot health issues and the choice of footwear. One such study found that the footwear choices of young women in 2012 were activity-specific and participants chose the style and design of shoes related to the image they wanted to portray. Despite the connection between some types of footwear with foot pain or foot health issues, young women apparently were not influenced by such concerns in making footwear choices.

Citations

General bibliography

External links 

Formal wear
High-heeled footwear
Shoes